This article lists important figures and events in Malaysian public affairs during the year 2001, as well as births and deaths of notable Malaysians.

Incumbent political figures

Federal level
Yang di-Pertuan Agong: 
Sultan Salahuddin Abdul Aziz Shah (until 21 November)
Tuanku Syed Sirajuddin (from 27 November)
Raja Permaisuri Agong: 
Tuanku Siti Aishah (until 21 November)
Tuanku Fauziah (from 27 November)
Prime Minister: Dato' Sri Dr Mahathir Mohamad
Deputy Prime Minister: Dato' Sri Abdullah Ahmad Badawi
Chief Justice: Mohamed Dzaiddin Abdullah

State level
 Sultan of Johor: Sultan Iskandar
 Sultan of Kedah: Sultan Abdul Halim Muadzam Shah
 Sultan of Kelantan: Sultan Ismail Petra
 Raja of Perlis: Tuanku Syed Faizuddin (Regent from 27 November)
 Sultan of Perak: Sultan Azlan Shah
 Sultan of Pahang: Sultan Ahmad Shah
 Sultan of Selangor: 
Tengku Idris Shah (Regent until 21 November)
Sultan Sharafuddin Idris Shah (from 21 November)
 Sultan of Terengganu: Sultan Mizan Zainal Abidin (Deputy Yang di-Pertuan Agong)
 Yang di-Pertuan Besar of Negeri Sembilan: Tuanku Jaafar
 Yang di-Pertua Negeri (Governor) of Penang:
 Tun Dr Hamdan Sheikh Tahir (until May)
 Tun Abdul Rahman Abbas (from May)
 Yang di-Pertua Negeri (Governor) of Malacca: Tun Syed Ahmad Al-Haj bin Syed Mahmud Shahabuddin
 Yang di-Pertua Negeri (Governor) of Sarawak: Tun Abang Muhammad Salahuddin
 Yang di-Pertua Negeri (Governor) of Sabah: Tun Sakaran Dandai

Events
15 January – Nine people are killed and five are seriously injured when an express bus and a trailer lorry collide head-on at the 24th kilometre of the Sarikei-Sibu road (Pan Borneo Highway) during heavy rain. 
1 February – Putrajaya is transferred to the federal government and comes the third Federal Territory after Kuala Lumpur and Labuan. 
April – Malaysia Airlines becomes the first airline in the world to pilot a twin-engine commercial jet through the newly opened polar routes, passing through the inhospitable regions of Russia and North Alaska. 
12 April – Twelve women and a boy are killed when a bus skids and crashes into a ditch off the Pengkalan Hulu-Baling road near Baling, Kedah.  
17 April – Tuanku Syed Sirajuddin is installed as Raja of Perlis.
14 May – Cuban President, Fidel Castro makes an official visit to Malaysia. Malaysia establishes diplomatic relations with Cuba.
13 June – KL Sentral, the biggest transportation station in Kuala Lumpur as well in Malaysia is opened, replacing the old Kuala Lumpur Railway Station.
29 June – Dewan Tunku Canselor at the University of Malaya, Kuala Lumpur  is destroyed by fire.
12 August – A 'fireball' UFO is spotted at the Second Link that joins Malaysia and Singapore.
5 September – MyKad, the Malaysian Government Multipurpose Card is launched.
8–17 September – 2001 Southeast Asian Games:
The 2001 Southeast Asian Games opening ceremony is held in the National Stadium at the National Sports Complex. The games are opened by the Yang di-Pertuan Agong, Sultan Salahuddin Abdul Aziz Shah.
This 21st edition games are the fifth time Malaysia hosted the games, and the first time since 1989.
Around 4,165 athletes from ten Southeast Asian nations participate in the games, which feature 391 events in 32 sports.
The closing ceremony is held on 17 September in the National Stadium at National Sports Complex. The games are closed by Prime Minister, Tun Dr. Mahathir Mohamad.
Malaysia won 111 gold medals, 75 silver medals and 85 bronze medals, emerging overall champion in first place.
11 September – The September 11 attacks in New York City, USA. More than 2,602 people were killed, including three Malaysians.
19-21 October – 2001 Malaysian motorcycle Grand Prix
26–29 October – 2001 ASEAN Para Games:
This first edition of these games for athletes with physical disabilities is held in Kuala Lumpur. Ten Southeast Asian nations participated at the games. Malaysia won 143 gold medals, 136 silver medals and 92 bronze medals in this edition and emerges overall champion in first place.
2 November – Maznah Ismail (aka Mona Fandey), Mohd Affendi Abdul Rahman and Juraimi Hussin, three infamous criminals who killed Dato' Mazlan Idris, a Batu Talam DUN assemblyman of Pahang state, are executed in Kajang Prison, Kajang, Selangor.
21 November – The 11th Yang di-Pertuan Agong, Sultan Salahuddin Abdul Aziz Shah of Selangor dies at the age of 75. His body is brought back to Selangor and laid to rest at the royal mausoleum near Sultan Sulaiman Mosque, Klang. The Raja Muda of Selangor Tengku Idris Shah becomes the 9th Sultan of Selangor with the title Sultan Sharafuddin Idris Shah.
13 December – Tuanku Syed Sirajuddin of Perlis becomes the 12th Yang di-Pertuan Agong.
26 December – Tropical Storm Vamei hits Johor.

Births
 6 March  – Aidil Nazmi Norazman, actor 
 29 March  – Noor Nadira Kamal, chef
 20 April  – Muhammad Ikhmal Jamil, e-sports player
 7 May  – Nishan Velupillay, footballer 
 11 June  – Muhammad Haikal Adnan Shaharudin, footballer
 16 August  – Mohammad Afiq Haikal Haruddin, footballer 
 7 November  – Mukhairi Ajmal, footballer
 1 December  – Muhammad Ariff Azhan Kamaludin, e-sports player

Deaths
 2 November – Mona Fandey, murderer and singer (executed)
21 November – Salahuddin of Selangor, 11th Yang di-Pertuan Agong
29 November – Usman Awang, poet and writer

See also
 2001
 History of Malaysia
 List of Malaysian films of 2001

References 

 
Malaysia
Years of the 21st century in Malaysia
2000s in Malaysia
Malaysia